Gertie may refer to:

People
 Gertie Brown (1878–1934), vaudeville performer and one of the first African-American film actresses
 Gertie Eggink (born 1980), Dutch sidecarcross rider
 Gertie Evenhuis (1927–2005), Dutch writer of children's literature
 Gertie Fröhlich (1930–2020), Austrian painter and graphic designer
 Gertie Gitana (1887–1957), English singer
 Gertie Millar, Countess of Dudley, (1879–1952), English actress and singer
 Gertie Wandel (1894–1988), Danish textile artist

Arts and entertainment

Fictional characters
 Gertie (Hey Arnold!), in the television series Hey Arnold!
 Gertie, in the film E.T. the Extra-Terrestrial
 Gertie Gator, one of the toys in the PBS Kids series Noddy.
 Gertie Growlerstien, a fictional monster from the Disney Junior TV series Henry Hugglemonster
 Gravel Gertie (character),  in the comic strip Dick Tracy
 the title character of Gertie the Dinosaur, a 1914 film
Gertie Cummins, secondary character in Rodger & Hammerstein's Broadway musical Oklahoma!

Sculptures
 Gertie the Duck, a 1997 sculpture of a mallard that roosted under a bridge in Milwaukee

Other uses
 Gewürztraminer, or "gertie", a type of wine grape
 Galloping Gertie, a suspension bridge
 Gravel Gertie, a room designed for safe inspection, handling or dismantling of nuclear weapons
 Gruesome Gertie, an electric chair

See also
Gerty (disambiguation)

English feminine given names
Lists of people by nickname
Hypocorisms